Macaduma toxophora is a moth of the subfamily Arctiinae first described by Turner in 1899. It is found along the eastern coast of Australia from southern Queensland to Victoria.

References

Macaduma
Moths described in 1899